The Feast of San Gennaro (in Italian: Festa di San Gennaro), also known as San Gennaro Festival, is a Neapolitan and Italian-American patronal festival dedicated to Saint Januarius, patron saint of Naples and Little Italy, New York.

His feast is celebrated on 19 September in the calendar of the Catholic Church.

In the United States, the "Festa of San Gennaro" is also a highlight of the year for New York's Little Italy, with the saint's polychrome statue carried through the middle of a street fair stretching for blocks.

In Italy 

In Naples and neighboring areas, an annual celebration and feast of faith held is over the course of three days, commemorating Saint Gennaro. Throughout the festival, parades, religious processions and musical entertainment are featured.

In the United States

Little Italy, New York 

The festival was first celebrated in the United States in September 1926, when immigrants from Naples congregated along Mulberry Street in the Little Italy section of Manhattan in New York City to continue the tradition they had followed in Italy to celebrate Saint Januarius, the Patron Saint of Naples.

The immigrant families on Mulberry Street who started the feast, a group of cafe owners, erected a small chapel in the street to house the image of their patron Saint. They invited all to partake of their wares, asking the devoted to pin an offering to the ribbon streamers that are hung from the statue's apron. This money was then distributed to the needy poor of the neighborhood. Originally a one-day religious commemoration, over time, the festival expanded into an 11-day street fair organized and run by people outside the neighborhood. It is now an annual celebration of food and drink, and a major tourist attraction.

Centered on Mulberry Street, which is closed to traffic for the occasion, the festival generally features sausages, zeppole, street vendors, games, parades and other such attractions. The Grand Procession is held starting at 2 p.m. on the last Saturday of the feast, immediately after a celebratory Mass at the Church of the Most Precious Blood. This is a Roman Catholic candlelit procession in which the statue of San Gennaro is carried from its permanent home in the Most Precious Blood Church through the streets of Little Italy.

Another festival is held with the same attractions in New York City's other Little Italy, in the Fordham/Belmont community in the Bronx. The streets are closed to traffic, and the festivities begin early in the morning and proceed late into the night.

Corruption 
In 1995, following the exposure of financial improprieties and mafia involvement, New York City Mayor Rudy Giuliani declared that if the city's San Gennaro festival did not remove corrupt elements, he would shut it down.
After Giuliani's ultimatum, a community group was formed to manage the festival; the municipal government asked it to hire a professional manager, and it hired Mort Berkowitz to be the financial manager.

Other locations 
Similar festivals have also been sponsored in other cities, the most recent being Belmar, New Jersey. The Feast of San Gennaro of the Jersey Shore was founded in 2012 by Daniel Di Cesare, whose goal was to highlight the positive contributions of Italian Americans.

In 2002, Jimmy Kimmel, Adam Carolla, and Doug DeLuca founded the Feast of San Gennaro Los Angeles, which is now a major annual event held every September in Hollywood. Also, Tony Sacca brought The Feast of San Gennaro to the Las Vegas Valley, Nevada, in 1986. The event started small in a park, but due to its success moved to larger grounds. It is held twice a year, in the Spring and Fall. The Las Vegas, Nevada, festival has traditional Italian cuisine, carnival rides and games, and entertainers such as Emilio Baglioni and Louis Prima's daughter, Lena Prima.

In 2011, Hampton Bays (Long Island, New York) started their San Gennaro celebration. It has since grown rapidly to become the largest San Gennaro Feast on Long Island, and second only to the Little Italy Feast in New York State. The Hampton Bays Feast of San Gennaro draws a huge crowd, with live bands, raffles and prizes, and vendors selling food and drink.

In 2013, The San Gennaro Foundation Seattle was formed by the Mascio family to bring the San Gennaro Festival to Seattle, WA.  Held the second week of September, it includes the processional of the San Gennaro statue, live music and food. This three day festival is held in the heart of Georgetown, WA, where many of Seattle's Italian community settled when they first arrived in Seattle.

In popular culture 
 In The Godfather Part III, Vincent Corleone assassinates Joey Zasa at the festa.
 It was a crime scene on CSI: NY in the season 2 episode "Corporate Warriors".
 It was also featured prominently in the 1973 movie Mean Streets.
 It is mentioned in the song "Sad Nights" by Blue Rodeo.
 In "The Ride" (Season 6 Episode 9 of The Sopranos) Tony, Carmela, and several other members of the family attend a fictitious festival in Newark patterned after this feast. It is the Feast of Elzéar of Sabra which also has a connection with Naples and is celebrated on September 27.
 Brian Altano tells a story about the (few) differences between the New Jersey festival and the Italian festival in The GameSpy Debriefings episode 158.
 On The Golden Girls, when the girls shared stories of how their children were conceived, Sophia Petrillo joyfully recalls how she and her husband Salvador attempted conception of Dorothy behind the sausage and pepper stand due to the excitement of the San Gennaro's festivities, much to Dorothy's dismay.
 On Laverne & Shirley, the two-part season 4 opener has the characters travelling to New York to attend the festival.
 In the Marvel: Avengers Alliance game, magic has brought the statue of San Gennaro to life, and a hero can be sent to fight it.
 On Family Guy: season 15 episode 2. When the Griffin family goes to the feast of San Gennaro.
 On Billions (TV series) Season 4 episode 2, Charles Rhodes is endorsed by the police commissioner, Richie Sansome making it known he is running for Attorney General of New York.

Gallery

See also 

 Cathedral of Saint Januarius – Naples Cathedral
 Church of the Most Precious Blood (Manhattan) – National Shrine Church of San Gennaro in New York
 Italians in New York City
 Patronal festival

Notes and references

Notes

References

External links 
  
 
 
 
 

Gennaro
Gennaro
Festivals in Manhattan
Gennaro
Italian-American culture in New York City
Street fairs
Cultural festivals in the United States
September observances